Lisa Shea is an American novelist and the author of books published by W.W. Norton & Company. She was the recipient of a 1993 Whiting Award.

Works

Hula W W Norton, 1994,

References

External links
Profile at The Whiting Foundation

Year of birth missing (living people)
Living people
American women novelists
21st-century American women